Phil Martin (aka Philip Martin Adelagan) (5 April 1950 – 27 May 1994) was an English professional light-heavyweight boxer. He fought during the 1970s with career statistics of won 14 (KO 6) and lost 6 (KO 4).

Early life
Martin was born in Moss Side, Manchester, England, on 5 April 1950.

Boxing career
He had a record of 14 wins and six defeat. The highlight of his career was beating former British Light Heavyweight Champion Gypsy Johnny Frankham over 10 rounds at Belle Vue, Greater Manchester, in November 1975. His professional career ended when he retired after the Ennio Cometti fight in 1978.

Martin went on to become a successful boxing trainer, after meeting with Chet Alexander who convinced him to return to a career in boxing in the role. Before this Martin had become involved in left-wing political activism, which he was frustrated with, and he moved enthusiastically back into the sport in the role of a trainer, working at the Alexander Foundation in Princess Road in Moss Side, Manchester. After taking classes in training at the Alexander Foundation, he set up his own gym in a disused building in Princess Road, Moss Side (in an area that had seen rioting in 1981), which he named the 'Champs Camp Gym', where he guided numerous boxers, such as Tony Ekubia, Frank Grant, Maurice Core, Ossie Maddix, Ensley Bingham and Steve Walker, to British European and Commonwealth title contests.

Death
Martin died on 27 May 1994 from the effects of cancer at the age of 44. The Champ Camp Gym was renamed the Phil Martin Centre in his honour.

Professional record

References

1950 births
1994 deaths
English male boxers
Light-heavyweight boxers
People from Moss Side